Michaelle C. Solages (born March 25, 1985) is an American politician serving as a member of the New York State Assembly, representing the 22nd district which includes portions of the town of Hempstead in  Nassau County on Long Island. A Democrat, Solages was first elected in 2012.

Solages was born and raised in Elmont, New York. She graduated with a  Bachelor's Degree from Hofstra University's School of Education, Health and Human Services. Following graduation, Solages worked as a supervisor of access services at Hofstra's Axinn Library, modernizing library resources. She also worked as a legislative aide for a time.

In 2012, Solages won the Democratic nomination in the newly created 22nd district, which was drawn as a Democratic stronghold. She easily won her first election, and since then has never faced serious opposition. She is the first person of Haitian descent to be elected to the Assembly.  In the Assembly, Solages serves as the Deputy Majority Leader and Chair of the Black, Puerto Rican, Hispanic, and Asian Legislative Caucus.

In 2019, Solages put forth legislation to prohibit virginity tests.

She resides in Elmont, New York with her family. She is the sister of Nassau County Legislator Carrié Solages.

References

External links 

 New York Assemblywoman Michaelle C. Solages (D-Elmont)

Hofstra University alumni
People from Elmont, New York
Democratic Party members of the New York State Assembly
Women state legislators in New York (state)
American politicians of Haitian descent
Living people
21st-century American politicians
21st-century American women politicians
1985 births